Chloe Thomas is a film and TV director and producer, known for her work on "Hetty Feather", nominated for a BAFTA (Children's Award) in the category of Best Drama, and on "Horrible Histories" nominated for a BAFTA (Children's Award) in the category of Best Factual.

Career
Chloe Thomas has worked with Bwark Productions to produce the short film Shop Girl Diaries and the television series Angelo's, written by Sharon Horgan, which ran for six episodes.

Selected filmography

References

Living people
British television directors
Year of birth missing (living people)